Jackson Township is the name of 3 townships in the U.S. state of North Carolina:

 Jackson Township, Nash County, North Carolina
 Jackson Township, Northampton County, North Carolina
 Jackson Township, Union County, North Carolina

See also 
 Jackson Township (disambiguation)

North Carolina township disambiguation pages